Paula Risikko (born 4 June 1960, Ylihärmä) is a Finnish politician. She is from Seinäjoki and represents the National Coalition Party. Risikko has previously served as the Minister of Social Services 2011–2014 and Minister of Transport and Local Government 2014–2015.

Paula Risikko is Doctor of Science (Health Care) in 1997 from the University of Tampere. Her dissertation was entitled “The current and future quality requirement in nursery”. Risikko has received Honorary Doctorate from the University of Vaasa. She is taking a break from her regular position as the Vice Rector of the Seinäjoki University of Applied Sciences, because her involvement in politics. In 2007 parliamentary elections, Risikko received 9 266 votes.

In the wake of the 2018 Oulu children sexual abuse gangs, Risikko stated her position in favor of deporting foreign sexual predators, saying: "We’ll deliver punishments for these kinds of crimes and, if necessary, send you back to your home country.”

Risikko has donated to numerous health care organizations such as the NGO's addressing Autism and Asperger's Syndrome, the Finnish delegation to the Cancer Society, Diabetes Association, Finland MS Association, Arthritis Foundation and, for example, Alfred Korde's Finland and UNIFEM- Organization.

Risikko has been married to her husband Heikki Tapani Risikko since 2000. In 2006 Paula and her husband adopted a Chinese daughter Aino Taika Huanzhen.

References

External links
 Paula Risikko's web pages

|-

1960 births
Living people
People from Ylihärmä
National Coalition Party politicians
Ministers of the Interior of Finland
Ministers of Social Affairs of Finland
Ministers of Transport and Public Works of Finland
Speakers of the Parliament of Finland
Members of the Parliament of Finland (2003–07)
Members of the Parliament of Finland (2007–11)
Members of the Parliament of Finland (2011–15)
Members of the Parliament of Finland (2015–19)
Members of the Parliament of Finland (2019–23)
Women government ministers of Finland
21st-century Finnish women politicians
Female interior ministers
Women members of the Parliament of Finland
University of Tampere alumni